Cyperus fendlerianus is a species of sedge that is endemic to southern parts of North America.

The species was first formally described by the botanist Johann Otto Boeckeler in 1868.

See also 
 List of Cyperus species

References 

fendlerianus
Taxa named by Johann Otto Boeckeler
Plants described in 1868
Flora of Mexico
Flora of Arizona
Flora of Texas
Flora of Wyoming
Flora of New Mexico
Flora of Colorado
Flora without expected TNC conservation status